Jeroen is a Dutch male given name originating from the Greek Hieronymus, and is equivalent to the English name Jerome. In the Netherlands, there are around 52,000 people who are named Jeroen, while in Belgium there are around 11,000 people of that name. Jeroen may refer to:

Belgian people 
Jeroen Van Herzeele (born 1965), jazz saxophonist

Dutch people
Jeroen Bleekemolen (born 1981), professional racing driver
Jeroen Blijlevens (born 1971), cyclist
Jeroen de Lange (born 1968), politician
Jeroen Delmee (born 1973), field hockey player
Jeroen Dijsselbloem (born 1966), politician
Jeroen Dubbeldam (born 1973), equestrian
Jeroen Duyster (born 1966), rower
Jeroen Groenendijk (born 1949), philosopher
Jeroen Hoencamp (born 1966), businessman
Jeroen Krabbé (born 1944), actor
Jeroen Lenaers (born 1984), politician
Jeroen Oerlemans (1970–2016), photojournalist
Jeroen Recourt (born 1970), politician
Jeroen Smits (born 1972), cricketer
Jeroen Paul Thesseling (born 1971), bassist and composer
Jeroen Tel (born 1972), composer
Jeroen van Aken (also called Hieronymus Bosch) (1450–1516), painter
Jeroen van den Hoven (born 1957), philosopher
Jeroen van der Boom (born 1972), singer 
Jeroen van der Veer (born 1947), businessman
Jeroen van Koningsbrugge (born 1973), comedian/actor
Jeroen van Veen (bassist) (born 1974), bassist
Jeroen van Veen (pianist) (born 1969), classical pianist and composer
Jeroen van Wijngaarden (born 1978), politician
Jeroen Wiedenhof (born 1959), linguist
Jeroen Willems (1962–2012), actor

nl:Jeroen